The Redundancy Payments Act 1965 (c 62) was a UK Act of Parliament that introduced into UK labour law the principle that after a qualifying period of work, people would have a right to a severance payment in the event of their jobs becoming economically unnecessary to the employer. The functions of the redundancy payment were to internalise the social cost of unemployment to the employer, make employers think more carefully before making people redundant, to compensate the employee for the loss of a job, and to provide a minimum sum of money for the employee in case future employment could not immediately be found. Together with the requirement of statutory minimum notice in the Contracts of Employment Act 1963, and the right to a fair dismissal first found from the Industrial Relations Act 1971, redundancy pay forms one of the three pillars of rights in dismissal.

The RPA 1965 was eventually codified in the Employment Protection (Consolidation) Act 1978, and its provisions are now updated and found in the Employment Rights Act 1996 section 135 ff.

See also
Lesney Products & Co v Nolan [1977] ICR 235
UK labour law

United Kingdom labour law
United Kingdom Acts of Parliament 1965
1965 in labor relations